Charles Martin Bewley (born 25 January 1981) is an English actor and producer best known for his role as the vampire Demetri in The Twilight Saga films, Charles Wentworth on Nashville, and Galen Vaughn on The Vampire Diaries.

Personal life
Bewley was born in London, England and raised on a farm in Leicester. He is the eldest of four children, having a sister Lydia and brothers James and Andrew. He attended Loughborough Grammar School in Leicestershire and Oakham School in Rutland. Bewley spent some time living in Vancouver. He now resides in Los Angeles.

Career
Since Twilight, Charlie has starred in Hammer of the Gods and guest-starred on The Vampire Diaries. Bewley's most recent project is a Kickstarter campaign for a film called Thunder Road, he is working with partners Matt Dallas and Steven Grayhm. He also stars as Leon in the 2014 British adventure movie Rules of the Game.

Filmography

Film

Television

Music Video

(2015) 
Mandy Allyn-  Say It First

References

External links
 

.

1981 births
Living people
21st-century English male actors
British expatriate male actors in the United States
English expatriates in Canada
English male film actors
English male television actors
Male actors from Leicestershire
Male actors from London
People educated at Loughborough Grammar School
People educated at Oakham School
People from Leicester